The Roadhouse Murder is a 1932 American pre-Code thriller film directed by J. Walter Ruben and written by J. Walter Ruben and Gene Fowler. The film stars Dorothy Jordan, Eric Linden, Purnell Pratt, Roscoe Ates and David Landau. The film was released on April 28, 1932, by RKO Pictures.

Cast 
Dorothy Jordan as Mary Agnew
Eric Linden as Chick Brian
Purnell Pratt as Inspector Agnew	
Roscoe Ates as Joyce
David Landau as Kraft
Bruce Cabot as Dykes
Phyllis Clare as Louise Rand
Gustav von Seyffertitz as Porter 
Roscoe Karns as Dale 
William Morris as Judge
Frank Sheridan as District Attorney
Carl Gerard as Defense Attorney

References

External links 
 
 

1932 films
American black-and-white films
1930s English-language films
RKO Pictures films
Films directed by J. Walter Ruben
1930s thriller films
American thriller films
1930s American films